Malook Nagar (born 3 July 1964) is an Indian politician and businessman who is a Member of Parliament in the 17th Lok Sabha from Bijnor. He unsuccessfully contested Meerut and Bijnor Lok Sabha constituencies of Uttar Pradesh in 2009 and 2014 respectively as a candidate of the Bahujan Samaj Party.

Personal life
Nagar was born on 3 July 1964 to Rameshwar Dayal Nagar and Shanti Nagar in Shakarpur village of Hapur district of Uttar Pradesh. He completed his high school in 1980 from HNS College Upera and Intermediate from A S Inter College Mawana, Meerut in 1983. He graduated with a Bachelor of Science degree (in 1985) from SSV Degree College in Hapur. He married Sudha Nagar on 6 July 1969, with whom he has two sons.

Business interests
Nagar is a businessman. In October 2020, income tax raids were carried out against Nagar's group companies that are engaged in real estate and their associates.

References 

1964 births
Living people
India MPs 2019–present
Uttar Pradesh politicians
Businesspeople from Uttar Pradesh
Bahujan Samaj Party politicians from Uttar Pradesh